The Ministry of Security of Bosnia and Herzegovina is the governmental department in charge of organizing and coordinating the Bosnian police.

History
Following the independence of Bosnia and Herzegovina in 1992 from the Socialist Federal Republic of Yugoslavia (SFRY), the Ministry of Interior of the Republic of Bosnia and Herzegovina began to operate at the level of the newly established Republic of Bosnia and Herzegovina, with Alija Delimustafić (SDA) as minister.

After the end of the Bosnian War and the signing of the Dayton Agreement in 1995, the work of police bodies was shared between the Bosnia and Herzegovina entities Republika Srpska and the Federation of Bosnia and Herzegovina, which then formed their own ministries of interior, while the work of police bodies in the Federation of Bosnia and Herzegovina was further shared between its cantons.

In 2002, the Ministry of Security of Bosnia and Herzegovina was formed, with Bariša Čolak (HDZ BiH) being appointed the first Minister of Security of Bosnia and Herzegovina.

Organization
The Ministry of Security of Bosnia and Herzegovina consists of nine sectors and one inspectorate.
Protection and Rescue Sector
Sector for legal, personnel, general and financial-material affairs
Sector for International Cooperation and European Integration
Immigration Sector
Asylum Sector
Sector for Combating Terrorism, Organized Crime, Corruption, War Crimes and Narcotics Abuse
Sector for Informatics and Telecommunication Systems
Sector for the Protection of Classified Information
Sector for General and Border Security
Inspectorate

List of ministers

Ministers of Security of Bosnia and Herzegovina (2002–present)

Political parties:

References

External links

Security
Security
Bosnia and Herzegovina, Security